August 1991 is a 2005 television dramatization of a failed Soviet attempt to suppress the Singing Revolution independence movement in Estonia. At the same time as the events unfold in Estonia, a 1991 Soviet coup d'état attempt is taking place in Moscow. Tanks roll through the streets of Estonia, attempting to crush the fledgling democracy and assert Soviet authority.  Written and directed by Ilmar Raag for Estonian Television, the film focuses on the role of a newly defiant and independent Estonian media. In spite of a low budget and sometimes wooden acting, the film is seen as an effective, moving portrayal of Estonian independence.

Cast
Tanel Ingi as Tõnu 
Hilje Murel as Anu 
Andres Mähar as Paul 
Hele Kõre as Anneli 
Tõnu Oja as Aare 
Peeter Tammearu as Mart Siimann 
Andres Noormets as Hagi Shein 
Hendrik Toompere Jr. as Andres Raid 
Gert Raudsep as Tiit Kimmel 
Tiina Mälberg as Virve Liivanõmm 
Rain Simmul as Heimar Lenk 
Tiit Palu as Enn Eesmaa 
Hans Kaldoja as Aivo Barbo 
Aksel Lemberg as Endel Sõerde
Indrek Taalmaa as Carl Danhammer

References

External links
 

2005 drama films
2005 television films
2005 films
Estonian-language films
Films based on actual events
Estonian drama films